Lausii Taliauli (born 8 June 1993) is a New Zealand-born Australian rugby union footballer who currently plays as a winger for the  in Super Rugby. He also represented the Canberra Vikings in the inaugural National Rugby Championship.

Career

Born in New Zealand but raised on Australia's Gold Coast since the age of 14, Taliauli began to make strides in his rugby career playing for the famous Southport School. After graduation, he switched to rugby league and played for the Gold Coast Titans under-20 side for 2 years before concentrating on sevens rugby. Issues regarding his Australian citizenship saw him released to play for the Canberra Vikings for the latter part of the 2014 National Rugby Championship season.

International career

Taliauli represented the Australia Sevens team in 2014.

Super Rugby statistics

References

1993 births
Australian rugby union players
Australian sportspeople of Tongan descent
Rugby union wings
Male rugby sevens players
Canberra Vikings players
ACT Brumbies players
Australia international rugby sevens players
New Zealand emigrants to Australia
Rugby union players from Wellington City
People from the Gold Coast, Queensland
People educated at the Southport School
Living people